Hossan Leong (born 10 July 1969) is a Singaporean stage and screen actor, television host, radio deejay and comedian.

Personal life
He was born 10 July 1969 in Singapore, Leong was educated at Anglo-Chinese School and Anglo-Chinese Junior College and studied electronics at the French-Singapore Institute, which was since transferred in February 1993 and currently part of Nanyang Polytechnic.

Career
Leong started his showbiz career as a television actor and starred in several TCS English and Chinese language dramas during the 1990s before diversifying into theatre and comedy.

Having learned French while studying at the French-Singapore Institute, he is fluent in the language and worked with the Alliance française for some time. In 2010 he was conferred the Chevalier de l'Ordre des Arts et des Lettres by the French Ministry of Culture.

Besides acting, Leong was also a radio deejay with Gold 90.5FM. He came under media spotlight after he was reportedly censured for announcing the disruption to the Circle Line train services on the morning of 14 December 2011 as SMRT had not issued an official statement. As host of the weekday breakfast show, Leong had a practice of reading out user comments on Twitter account regarding public transport and traffic conditions. The station's response triggered massive criticism from many netizens and listeners already angered by SMRT's delay in announcing the disruption, which took place during the early morning "rush hour" and affected thousands. Leong later released an apology on his Twitter account and asked readers to "move on" from the incident.

Filmography

Film

Television

Theatre

Shows hosted
We Are Singaporeans (2011 - present)
The Rocky Horror Show (2012) (Singapore tour)
National Day Parade 2014

References

External links

Agency's profile
Profile on xin.msn.com
Official Twitter Page

Singaporean male film actors
Singaporean male stage actors
Singaporean television personalities
Anglo-Chinese School alumni
Anglo-Chinese Junior College alumni
Nanyang Polytechnic alumni
Singaporean people of Chinese descent
Singaporean people of Cantonese descent
1969 births
Living people
20th-century Singaporean male actors
21st-century Singaporean male actors